Gabrielle Senft (born 13 June 1997) is a Canadian rugby union player.

Rugby career 
Senft made her international debut for Canada against England in November 2018. She signed with Exeter Chiefs for the 2021–2022 Premier 15s season. She previously played for Bristol in 2019 and has also spent time with the Queensland Reds in the Super W.

Senft competed for Canada at the delayed 2021 Rugby World Cup in New Zealand. She featured against the Eagles in the quarterfinals, against England in the semifinal, and in the third place final against France.

References 

Living people
1997 births
Female rugby union players
Canadian female rugby union players
Canada women's international rugby union players